Iriao, also known as Ethno-Jazz Band Iriao, are a Georgian jazz and ethno folk group, led by David Malazonia (composition and keyboard). The band plays a combination of traditional Georgian polyphonic singing and jazz. They performed at the 2014 edition of the Borneo Jazz Festival in Malaysia. They represented Georgia at the Eurovision Song Contest 2018 in Lisbon, Portugal with the song "Sheni gulistvis" (English: "For You").

References

Musical groups from Georgia (country)
Musical groups established in 2013
2013 establishments in Georgia (country)
Eurovision Song Contest entrants for Georgia (country)
Eurovision Song Contest entrants of 2018